KDB Ijtihad (17) is the lead ship of the Ijtihad-class patrol boats. The vessel is in active service in the Royal Brunei Navy (RBN).

Development

Background 
A total of four Ijtihad-class fast patrol boats have been commissioned into service with the Royal Brunei Navy (RBN), where two of the ships began operating since March 2010 followed by another two on 28 August 2010.

Two Ijtihad-class fast patrol boats arrived in Brunei Darussalam on 27 August 2010. The boats, named Kapal Diraja Brunei (KDB) Syafaat and KDB Afiat were commissioned at the RBN Base in Muara, Brunei. They are part of the project between the government of His Majesty The Sultan and Yang Di-Pertuan of Negara Brunei Darussalam and Lürssen Werft.

The commissioning ceremony of both vessels was officiated by Major General Dato Paduka Seri Haji Aminuddin Ihsan bin Pehin Orang Kaya Saiful Mulok Dato Seri Paduka Haji Abidin, Commander of the Royal Brunei Armed Forces (RBAF). Like previous fast patrol boats, KDB Syafaat and KDB Afiat were produced in Germany and completed sea trials. KDB Ijtihad and KDB Berkat began operations on 15 March 2010.

Construction and career 
KDB Ijtihad was built by Lürssen Werft company in Germany around the 2009. She is part of the first batch delivered from Germany to Brunei. Ijtihad and KDB Berkat commissioned together on 15 March 2010 at Muara Naval Base. All four of her sister ships work in the patrol craft role.

Exercise Hornbill 21/2011 
Royal Malaysian Navy and Royal Brunei Navy concluded Exercise Hornbill from 19 to 23 December 2011 which consists of KDB Afiat, KDB Ijtihad, KD Kedah and KD Ganas.

Exercise Hornbill 22/2012 
KDB Ijtihad, KDB Darussalam, KD Lekir, KD Laksamana Tan Pusmah and KD Kasturi attendee Exercise Hornbill 22/2012 from 3 to 8 December 2012, hosted by both Royal Brunei Navy and Royal Malaysian Navy.

Exercise Hornbill 24/2014 
KDB Ijtihad, KDB Darulehsan, KD Selangor and KD Ganas attendee Exercise Hornbill 24/2014 from 18 to 24 November 2014, hosted by both Royal Brunei Navy and Royal Malaysian Navy.

POLMAR 2015 
Exercise POLMAR is held by Royal Brunei Navy and Royal Brunei Marine Police Force for 4 days in Muara Naval Base from 2 to 5 June 2015. It consists of KDB Ijtihad, KDB Serasa and Naval Action Surface Group.

References 

Fast attack craft
Royal Brunei Navy
Ships of Brunei
2009 ships